Devdas  is a Bengali-language film based on the Sharat Chandra Chattopadhyay novel Devdas. It is the first Bangladeshi version of the story and the first colour film version in Bangladesh. It was the first of two versions directed by Chashi Nazrul Islam.

Cast
 Bulbul Ahmed as Devdas
 Kobori as Parboti
 Anwara Begum as Chandramukhi
 Rahman as Chunilal
 Anwar Hossain as Dharmadas
 Golam Mustafa

Soundtrack
The music was composed by Khondokar Nurul Alam, penned by Md. Rafikujjaman and sung by Runa Laila, Sabina Yasmin and Subir Nandi.

References

External links
 

1982 films
1982 romantic drama films
Bengali-language Bangladeshi films
Bangladeshi romantic drama films
Devdas films
Films scored by Khandaker Nurul Alam
1980s Bengali-language films
Films directed by Chashi Nazrul Islam